John Matthew Ranson (born 26 July 1938) is a former England international rugby union player.

Ranson represented England as a wing threequarter eleven times between 1963 and 1964, including seven test match caps. He scored two test tries, one on his debut vs New Zealand in Auckland during the 1963 England rugby union tour of Australasia and another versus Wales.

Ranson was educated at Durham School. He played club rugby for Durham City, Rosslyn Park and Headingley RFC as well as representing the Barbarian F.C.

He is the son of Jack Ranson, a former professional footballer.

References

External links 
Statistics, at Scrum.com
 http://rosslynpark.co.uk

1938 births
Living people
Barbarian F.C. players
England international rugby union players
English rugby union players
Leeds Tykes players
People educated at Durham School
Place of birth missing (living people)
Rosslyn Park F.C. players
Rugby union players from Durham, England
Rugby union wings